Lettau may refer to:

 Lettau (surname), including a list of people with the name
 Lettau Peak, Victoria Land, Antarctica
 Lettau Bluff, Ross Dependency, Antartica